The Complicated Futility of Ignorance is the third and final studio album by English rock band Fudge Tunnel, released in September 1994 by Earache Records. The album is notable for being the band's heaviest.

Overview

The Complicated Futility of Ignorance is noted for being the heaviest and most extreme album of the band. While being a mostly sludge album, it is also leaning towards groove metal and in particular, the song "Six Eight" is played in a doom metal style.

Reception

AllMusic's Vincent Jeffries gave the album four stars out of five, and noted the release as being "the best of this group's many fine offerings". Trouser Press wrote that "as a refined dose of pure musical aggression that grabs, holds and savages ... it’s the band’s most effective".

The album won a 1995 NAIRD Indie Award, in the Hard Music category.

Track listing

Track 12 is unlisted (but mentioned in the booklet) and includes five minutes of silence before the song starts.

Personnel

Fudge Tunnel

Alex Newport – vocals, guitars
David Ryley – bass guitar
Adrian Parkin – drums, percussion

Additional personnel

Dave Buchanan – engineering
John Cornfield – engineering

References

1994 albums
Fudge Tunnel albums